This article lists the squads of the women's hockey competition at the 2010 Commonwealth Games held in New Delhi, India from 4 to 13 October 2010.

Pool A

Australia
The squad was announced on 17 September 2010.

Head coach: Frank Murray

India
Head coach: Sandeep Somesh

Scotland
The squad was announced on 24 August 2010.

Head coach: Gordon Shepherd

South Africa
The squad was announced on 21 July 2010.

Head coach: Giles Bonnet

Trinidad and Tobago
Head coach: Anthony Marcano

Pool B

Canada
The squad was announced on 17 August 2010.

Head coach: Louis Mendonca

England
The squad was announced on 20 August 2010.

Head coach: Daniel Kerry

Malaysia
Head coach: Atan Yahya

New Zealand
The squad was announced on 12 August 2010.

Head coach:  Mark Hager

Wales
The squad was announced on 17 August 2010.

Head coach: Joanna Nightingale

References

External links
Official Website

squads
2010 in women's field hockey